Eisenheim is a market town and municipality in the district of Würzburg in Bavaria, Germany. It lies on the river Main.

Notable people
 Karl Friedrich Cerf, German theatre manager

See also
 List of Franconian wine towns

References

External links 

Würzburg (district)